Concho Elementary School District No. 6 is a K-8 school district located in Concho, unincorporated Apache County, Arizona.

Its only school is Concho Elementary School. It is a PS through 8th grade school, and students may then attend one of three high schools, Show Low, Blue Ridge, or St Johns High School. Concho Elementary School has been in existence for over 100 years.  

From 2020 to 2021 the number of students in the district increased by 3%.

References

External links

 

School districts in Apache County, Arizona